Alexander Joe Kapter ( – ) was a professional American football guard who played one season for the Cleveland Browns in the All-America Football Conference (AAFC). Kapter attended Northwestern University and joined the Browns after a stint in the U.S. Navy during World War II. Cleveland won the AAFC championship in 1946, his only season as a professional football player.

College career

Kapter attended Northwestern University, where he played on the Northwestern Wildcats football team. He started play as a sophomore year in 1941, but only became the team's regular left guard in 1942. Kapter entered the U.S. Navy in 1943, but was allowed to stay at Northwestern along with the football team's quarterback, Otto Graham, to finish the season. Kapter played in the College All-Star Game in 1943 and was named to the team again in 1944. The Navy barred him from participating in the 1944 game, however, because of a rule that disallowed any activity that would require an absence of 48 hours or more.

Professional career

Kapter was drafted in 1944 by the Detroit Lions, but military service delayed his entry into the professional ranks. He signed in 1946 to play for the Cleveland Browns, a team under formation in the new All-America Football Conference. Otto Graham, Kapter's teammate at Northwestern, also signed with the Browns. During the 1946 season, Kapter alternated on occasion with Bill Willis at right guard when Willis came down with strep throat. The Browns won the AAFC championship that year.

References

Bibliography

External links

 

1922 births
Sportspeople from Waukegan, Illinois
American football offensive guards
Cleveland Browns (AAFC) players
2005 deaths
Northwestern Wildcats football players
United States Navy personnel of World War II